Jung Soon-Won (born 12 October 1973) is a Korean former wrestler who competed in the 1996 Summer Olympics.

References

External links
 

1973 births
Living people
Olympic wrestlers of South Korea
Wrestlers at the 1996 Summer Olympics
South Korean male sport wrestlers
Wrestlers at the 1998 Asian Games
Asian Games competitors for South Korea
20th-century South Korean people